The Evidence (Proceedings in other Jurisdictions) Act 1975 (c.34) is an Act of the Parliament of the United Kingdom, the long title of which is "An Act to make new provision for enabling the High Court, the Court of Session and the High Court of Justice in Northern Ireland to assist in obtaining evidence required for the purposes of proceedings in other jurisdictions; to extend the powers of those courts to issue process effective throughout the United Kingdom for securing the attendance of witnesses; and for purposes connected with those matters."

The Act was passed in order to implement the Hague Evidence Convention of 18 March 1970 into English law. The Hague convention applies only to civil proceedings, but until June 1991 the Act also contained a provision for the courts to deal with letters rogatory in criminal matters, as well as international proceedings such as proceedings in the International Court of Justice.

External links
Full text of the Act

United Kingdom Acts of Parliament 1975